José Antonio Momeñe Campo (15 August 1940 – 23 December 2010) was a Spanish professional road bicycle racer, who finished 4th place in the general classification of the 1966 Tour de France. He was born in Zierbena. He competed in the individual road race and team time trial events at the 1960 Summer Olympics.

Palmarès 

1962
Vuelta a Andalucía
1963
Clásica a los Puertos de Guadarrama
1964
Clásica a los Puertos de Guadarrama
1966
Tour de France:
4th place overall classification
Vuelta a España:
Winner stage 3
1967
Gran Premio de Llodio
GP Pascuas
1968
Trofeo Elola

References

External links

1940 births
2010 deaths
Spanish male cyclists
Spanish Vuelta a España stage winners
Cyclists at the 1960 Summer Olympics
Olympic cyclists of Spain
People from Greater Bilbao
Sportspeople from Biscay
Cyclists from the Basque Country (autonomous community)